Marie-Josée Gibeau-Ouimet (born November 2, 1972 in Lachine, Quebec) is a Canadian sprint kayaker who competed from the early 1990s to the early 2000s (decade). She won four medals at the ICF Canoe Sprint World Championships with three golds (K-2 200 m: 1995, 1998; K-4 200 m: 1995) and a silver (K-4 200 m: 1997).

Gibeau-Ouimet also competed in two Summer Olympics, earning best finish of fifth on two occasions (K-2 500 m, K-4 500 m: both 1996).

References

1972 births
Living people
Canadian female canoeists
Canoeists at the 1996 Summer Olympics
Canoeists at the 2000 Summer Olympics
Canoeists from Montreal
Olympic canoeists of Canada
People from Lachine, Quebec
ICF Canoe Sprint World Championships medalists in kayak